Englehart station is located in the town of Englehart, Ontario, Canada.  It was a station stop for Northlander trains of Ontario Northland before service was discontinued in 2012. In 2021 the Government of Ontario announced plans to restore service using ONR from this station north to either Timminis or Cochrane by the mid 2020s. The modern two-storey station replaced an earlier station. Englehart was the halfway point for the Ontario Northland and served as the engineer swap-out point. The Building itself houses all the signal services for the Northern route. Englehart maintains a locomotive engine to be running 24/7 in case of an emergency on both side of Englehart, same with Cochrane and North Bay respectably. Englehart also has 11 storage tracks and a machine shop for repairs.

References

External links
ONR - Englehart Station

Ontario Northland Railway stations
Railway stations in Timiskaming District
Disused railway stations in Canada